Steven Michael Errede (born December 24, 1952) is an American experimental physicist, known for his leadership in the collaboration that experimentally confirmed the existence of the top quark.

Biography
Errede received in 1976 his B.S. from the University of Minnesota. For some time he worked at the University of Minnesota's Space Science Center on electronic payloads for sounding rockets used in studying the composition and magnetic field of Earth's upper atmosphere. In 1976 he became a graduate student in physics at Ohio State University, where he graduated with a Ph.D. in 1981. From 1981 to 1984 he was a postdoc at the University of Michigan, where he worked on the IMB Proton Decay Experiment. At the University of Illinois Urbana-Champaign (UIUC), he was from 1984 to 1989 an assistant professor and from 1989 to 1992 an associate professor and is since 1992 a full professor.

Errede and his team worked on the ATLAS experiment at CERN's Large Hadron Collider in Geneva, Switzerland. His research team built a major portion of the ATLAS experiment's Scintillating Tile Hadronic Calorimeter, used in the 2012 discovery of the Higgs boson.

In 1985 he was awarded a Sloan Research Fellowship. In 1995 he was elected a fellow of the APS in recognition of his "contributions to the understanding of the nature of the weak gauge bosons."

In 2013 he won the UIUC's Nordsieck Award for excellence in teaching physics. Errede developed laboratory equipment used in his teaching of undergraduate courses on acoustical physics and physics of musical instruments.

His wife is Deborah M. Errede, who has a Ph.D. in physics from the University of Michigan. His father, Louis A. Errede (1923–2017), had a PhD in organic chemistry from the University of Michigan and worked for 3M Company. Steven and Deborah Errede have worked together for many years and have a daughter Rachel.

Selected publications
  1988
  1991
  1994

References

External links
 
 

1952 births
Living people
20th-century American physicists
21st-century American physicists
Experimental physicists
Particle physicists
University of Minnesota alumni
University of Michigan alumni
University of Illinois Urbana-Champaign faculty
Sloan Research Fellows
Fellows of the American Physical Society